Breviraja nigriventralis, commonly known as the blackbelly skate, is a bathydemersal species of ray in the family Rajidae. It is found in the western Atlantic Ocean, in depths of 549 – 776 meters (about 1,800 - 2,550 feet). Male blackbelly skates can grow up to 40 centimetersin length.

References

 Eol.org Retrieved on February 8, 2011.
 Compagno, Leonard J. V. and Hamlett, William C., ed. (1999). Checklist of Living Elasmobranchs Sharks, Skates, and Rays: The Biology of Elasmobranch Fishes. Johns Hopkins University Press Baltimore: USA. .
 McEachran, John D., and Katherine A. Dunn. (1998). "Phylogenetic Analysis of Skates, a Morphologically Conservative Clade of Elasmobranchs" (Chondrichthyes: Rajidae). Copeia, vol. 1998, no. 2. pp. 271–290. ISBN/ISSN 0045-8511.M

blackbelly skate
Fish of the Western Atlantic
blackbelly skate